The NAACP Theatre Awards are NAACP member voted awards that started in 1991 and are presented annually. Below is the list for NAACP Theatre Award for Best Supporting Female – Local.

References

External links
 NAACP Theatre Awards

African-American theatre
NAACP Theatre Awards
Awards established in 1991
1991 establishments in the United States